Deepak Limbu: (born 4 May 1983) is a playback singer and winner of the first season of Nepali Tara of Nepal. He has done playback singing for more than one thousand nepali songs. He performed on a worldwide tour and won several musical awards from 2005-2016. Deepak is also one artist among 365 in a Melancholy Song which set in Guinness World Records in entitled "Most Vocal Solos in a Song Recording", is written, music composed and directed by Environmentalist Nipesh DHAKA.

Awards
 Nepali Tara - 2005
 Chinnalata Puraskar - 2007 
 Best Vocal Film Award -2008 
 National Film Award 2009- Best playback singer
 D-Cine Award 2010 - Best playback singer
 Narayan Gopal youth music prize - 2016

Music albums
Sugandha
Meri Priye
Nepali Tara
Timro Saath
Shreya

References

1983 births
Living people
People from Sunsari District
Limbu people
Nepalese playback singers
21st-century Nepalese male singers